Oleh Haras (born 5 December 1976) is a Ukrainian professional football coach and a former player.

Club career
He made his professional debut in the Ukrainian Premier League in 1992 for FC Karpaty Lviv.

Coaching career
In February 2012 he was returned to football as playing assistant coach for FC Lviv in the Ukrainian First League.

Honours
 Russian Premier League runner-up: 2000.
 Russian Premier League bronze: 1998.
 Russian Cup winner: 1997.
 Russian Cup finalist: 1998.

References

1976 births
Living people
Ukrainian footballers
Association football forwards
Ukrainian expatriate footballers
FC Karpaty Lviv players
FC Lviv (1992) players
FC Lviv players
FC Lokomotiv Moscow players
FC Fakel Voronezh players
Expatriate footballers in Russia
Russian Premier League players
Ukrainian Premier League players
Ukrainian First League players
Ukrainian Second League players
Ukrainian football managers
Sportspeople from Ivano-Frankivsk Oblast